The 1974 NCAA Division II football season, part of college football in the United States organized by the National Collegiate Athletic Association at the Division II level, began in September and concluded with the Division II Championship on December 14 at Hughes Stadium in Sacramento, California.

Central Michigan defeated Delaware 54–15 in the Camellia Bowl to win their only Division II national title. CMU moved up to Division I in 1975.

Conference standings

Conference summaries

Postseason

The 1974 NCAA Division II Football Championship playoffs were the second single-elimination tournament to determine the national champion of NCAA Division II college football.

The four quarterfinal games were played on campus and all four host teams advanced. The semifinals were the Pioneer Bowl in Wichita Falls, Texas, and the Grantland Rice Bowl in Baton Rouge, Louisiana. The championship game was the Camellia Bowl, held at Hughes Stadium in Sacramento, California for the second consecutive year. The Central Michigan Chippewas defeated the Delaware Fightin' Blue Hens 54–14 to win their first national title. After opening with a home loss to Division I Kent State, CMU won twelve straight to finish as D-II champions.

Playoff bracket

* Denotes host institution

Rankings

In 1974, United Press International (UPI) and the Associated Press (AP) ranked teams in their College Division or "small college" polls – which had started in 1958 and 1960, respectively – for the final time.  UPI published their final poll at the end of the regular season, while the AP waited until postseason games had been completed.  UPI's number one selection was the Louisiana Tech Bulldogs, who during the regular season were 10–0 while outscoring opponents 294–103.  The Bulldogs later lost in the playoffs to the Central Michigan Chippewas, winners of the tournament.  AP's number one selection was the Chippewas, who were 9–1 during the regular season and finished with an overall record of 12–1 while outscoring opponents 450–127.

United Press International (coaches) final poll
Published on November 27

Associated Press (writers) final poll
Published on December 24

Record includes NCAA Division II playoff games
Record includes NCAA Division III playoff games
Louisiana Tech final record actually 11–1
Western Carolina final record actually 9–2
Record includes NAIA Division I playoff games
Record includes NAIA Division II playoff games
Record includes Pelican Bowl win

See also
1974 NCAA Division I football season
1974 NCAA Division III football season
1974 NAIA Division I football season
1974 NAIA Division II football season

References